The 2011 Bord Gáis Energy GAA Hurling All-Ireland Under-21 Championship is the 48th staging of the All-Ireland Championship since its inception in 1964. Games were played between 1 June and 10 September 2011. Galway won the title after a 3-14 to 1-10 win against Dublin.

The Championship

Overview
The All-Ireland Under-21 Hurling Championship of 2010 will be run on a provincial basis as usual.  It will be a knockout tournament with pairings drawn at random in the respective provinces - there will be no seeds.

Each match will be played as a single leg. If a match is drawn a period of extra time will be played, however, if both sides were still level at the end of extra time a replay will take place.

Format

Leinster Championship

Quarter-finals: (2 matches) These are two lone matches between the first four teams drawn from the province of Leinster.  Two teams are eliminated at this stage while the two winners advance to the semi-finals.

Semi-finals: (2 matches) The two winners of the two quarter-final games join the two remaining Leinster teams, who received a bye to this stage, to make up the semi-final pairings.  Two teams are eliminated at this stage while the two winners advance to the final.

Final: (1 match) The winners of the two semi-finals contest this game.  One team is eliminated at this stage while the winners advance to the All-Ireland semi-final.

Munster Championship

Quarter-final: (1 match) This is a single match between the first two teams drawn from the province of Munster.  One team is eliminated at this stage while the winners advance to the semi-finals.

Semi-finals: (2 matches) The winners of the lone quarter-final game join the three remaining Munster teams, who received a bye to this stage, to make up the semi-final pairings.  Two teams are eliminated at this stage while the two winners advance to the final.

Final: (1 match) The winners of the two semi-finals contest this game.  One team is eliminated at this stage while the winners advance to the All-Ireland semi-final.

Fixtures

Leinster Under-21 Hurling Championship

Munster Under-21 Hurling Championship

Ulster Senior Hurling Championship

All-Ireland Under-21 Hurling Championship

Scoring statistics

Top scorers overall

Top scorers in a single game

References

External links
 Full list of results for the 2011 championship

Under 21
All-Ireland Under-21 Hurling Championship